Banco de Venezuela (abbreviated: BDV) is an international universal bank based in Caracas. It was the market leader in Venezuela until 2007, when it fell to third place, with an 11.3% market share for deposits; its major competitors are Banesco, Banco Mercantil and BBVA Banco Provincial. As of June 2008, it had 285 branches in Venezuela.

History 

The bank was founded in 1883 as Banco Comercial, which on 2 September 1890 changed its name to Banco de Venezuela. It was initially a loan and taxation financial institution for the Venezuelan government. In 1920, it had already established 10 branches in the country, and due to the lack of a central bank, the Banco de Venezuela became one of the six financial institutions with the right to issue banknotes, until the creation of the Banco Central de Venezuela in 1940.

In 1976, BDV inaugurated its hundredth branch nationwide. In 1978 the bank introduced 24-hour customer service, credit cards and new point of sales terminals. The bank opened branches in New York and Curaçao in 1977 and 1979 respectively, and two years later founded a subsidiary, Banco de Venezuela International, to offer a better service outside the country. In 1984, the bank inaugurated its new headquarters in the center of Caracas.

On 6 October 2000, BDV purchased 100% of Banco Caracas, becoming the largest bank in the country.

State involvement
In 1993, after three years struggle for shareholder control, Banco de Venezuela was taken over by Banco Consolidado to form Banco de Venezuela y Consolidado. However, Banco Consolidado was closed during the Venezuelan banking crisis of 1994. Following the closure, BDV suffered financial problems in the context of the national financial crisis. On 9 August 1994, BDV became the tenth bank bailed out by the Venezuelan government during the crisis, with the government taking a majority stake for an estimated at US$294m. In 1996 the bank was reprivatised, with Grupo Santander purchasing 93,38% of its shares, for around US$350m.

In June 2008, Grupo Santander began discussion with Venezuelan banker Victor Vargas, regarding a possible acquisition of BDV, but the Venezuelan government stopped the negotiations. On 31 July of the same year, Venezuelan President Hugo Chávez stated: "I'm interested in the purchase (by the government) and we going to nationalize it". However by March 2009 negotiations with Grupo Santander had still not been completed, and Finance Minister Ali Rodriguez said it was possible the takeover could be abandoned. A final agreement for a $1.05bn purchase price was signed in May 2009.

References 

Venezuela
Venezuela
1890 establishments in Venezuela
Government-owned companies of Venezuela
Companies listed on the Caracas Stock Exchange
Venezuelan brands
Companies based in Caracas